Voivodeship road 797 (abbreviated DW 797) is a route in the Polish voivodeship roads network. It runs through the Masovian Voivodeship (Otwock County), leading from Celestynów to Regut where it meets national road 50, a Warsaw transit bypass.

Cities and towns along the route 
 Celestynów
 Regut

Route plan 

797